Andrey Vlasov (1901 – 1946) was a Russian general and a Nazi collaborator

Andrey Vlasov may also refer to:

 Andrey Vlasov (footballer, born 1965), Russian football player